Happy Quinton Jele (born 1 January 1987) is a South African association football retired player  who played as a defender and captained the Orlando Pirates FC in the South African Premier Division. Mostly regarded as a club legend for the Soweto based giants,Jele holds the record for having the most appearances for Orlando Pirates  

.

Honours

Domestic competitions 
South African League titles :
Premier Soccer League : 2010–11, 2011–12

Cup competitions  

Nedbank Cup: 2011 , 2014
Telkom Knockout  :
 2011
MTN 8  : 2011, 2020

References

1987 births
Living people
People from Middelburg, Mpumalanga
South African soccer players
Association football defenders
Orlando Pirates F.C. players
South Africa international soccer players
South African Premier Division players